Ylber Latif Ramadani (born 12 April 1996) is an Albanian professional footballer who plays as a defensive midfielder for Scottish Premiership side Aberdeen and the Albania national team.

Club career

Ferizaj
He began his senior career at his hometown club Ferizaj, where he made a total of 42 appearances and scored 3 goals in the 2013–14 season.

Prishtina
In the beginning of the 2014–15 season, Ramadani signed for Prishtina where he made a total of 14 appearances and scored 1 goal for the club.

Drita
On 1 August 2015, Ramadani signed for Drita. During the first part of 2015–16 season, he made 17 league appearances as Drita later finished 10th, avoiding relegation by defeating Flamurtari 4–2 on penalties at the relegation play-offs.

Partizani
In December 2015, it was reported that Ramadani was set to join Kategoria Superiore side Partizani during the January transfer window, and he began training with the side before signing a three-year deal on 10 January 2016. However, the move was soon put on hold as Drita refused to release Ramadani, but the clubs were able to reach an agreement over the transfer and the move was made official one month later on 10 February. Following the end of the season, in which Ramadani made 42 appearances in all competitions, he was named Kategoria Superiore Best Young Player.

Vejle
On 14 June 2017, Danish 1st Division side Vejle announced the transfer Ramadani from Partizani Tirana for a fee of €200,000. The player was presented the same day and signed for the next four years. On 26 November 2017 Ramadani scored his first goal abroad against the second placed team Vendsyssel as Vejle took a 4–1 win to maintain the leading of the rankings after 19 weeks with 38 points. On 23 May 2021, the club announced that after 4 years at the club, Ramadani would not be signing a new contract.

MTK Budapest
On 14 June 2021, Ramadani signed with Hungarian side MTK Budapest on free transfer.

Aberdeen
On 8 June 2022, Ramadani signed for Scottish Premiership side Aberdeen for an undisclosed fee, signing a three-year deal.

International career

Kosovo
Ramadani received his first call-up from Kosovo under-19 manager Ramiz Krasniqi for the friendlies against Albania in October 2015. He played in the first match on 13 October, scoring in the 2–0 win.

He was also part of Kosovo under-21 squad.

Albania

Youth
On 27 August 2017, Ramadani received his first call up at the Albania under-21 by coach Redi Jupi for the 2017 UEFA European Under-21 Championship qualifying match against Greece. He debuted later on 10 October in the final qualifying match against Israel which was lost 4–0.

Ramadani continued to be part of under-21 side for the next qualifying campaign, as he was called in June 2017 for the friendly against France and the opening qualifying match against Estonia. He scored his first under-21 goal 10 November in the matchday 5 versus Northern Ireland as Albania missed out victory by conceding in the last minutes.

Senior
Ramadani received his first senior call-up by manager Christian Panucci for the friendly against Turkey on 13 November 2017. He described his first call-up as a "dream come true". He was an unused substitute as Albania won 3–2 away. Ramadani made his international debut for the Albania national football team in a friendly 1-0 loss to Norway on 26 March 2018.

Career statistics

Club

International goals
Scores and results list Albania's goal tally first.

Honours

Individual
Kategoria Superiore Best Young Player: 2016–17

References

External links

 Ylber Ramadani profile at FSHF.org

1996 births
Living people
People from Ferizaj
Kosovo Albanians
Association football midfielders
Albanian footballers
Albania international footballers
Albania youth international footballers
Albania under-21 international footballers
Kosovan footballers
Kosovo youth international footballers
KF Ferizaj players
FC Prishtina players
FC Drita players
FK Partizani Tirana players
Vejle Boldklub players
MTK Budapest FC players
Aberdeen F.C. players
Football Superleague of Kosovo players
Kategoria Superiore players
Danish 1st Division players
Danish Superliga players
Nemzeti Bajnokság I players
Albanian expatriate footballers
Albanian expatriate sportspeople in Denmark
Expatriate men's footballers in Denmark
Albanian expatriate sportspeople in Hungary
Expatriate footballers in Hungary
Albanian expatriate sportspeople in Scotland
Expatriate footballers in Scotland
Scottish Professional Football League players